This is a list of songs set in or referring to the city of Nashville, Tennessee that were written or performed by notable musicians.

0-9

20.000 Meilen by Chuckamuck

C
 "Crazy Town" by Jason Aldean, from Wide Open 2010,  country rock ("sign says Nashville, Tennessee")
 "Congregation" by Foo Fighters ft. Zac Brown from Sonic Highways 2014

D
 "Devil, Devil (Prelude: Princess Of Darkness)" by Eric Church from The Outsiders 2014
 "Down on Music Row" by Dolly Parton
 "Dream Dream Dream" by Marty Stuart

E
 "East Nashville Skyline" by Todd Snider

G
 "Guitar Town" by Steve Earle
 "Greetings From Nashville" by Jason & the Scorchers

H
 "Home" by Ben Rector

I
 "It Can't Be Nashville Every Night" by The Tragically Hip
 "I Love This Town" by Bon Jovi
 "I Want" by Good Lovelies
 "I'm Going To Nashville" by Dane Sharp

L
 "Let's Go Burn Ole Nashville Down" by Jello Biafra
 "Lullaby" by Shawn Mullins

N
 "Nashville" by David Mead
 "Nashville" by David Houston (written by Don Choate and Billy Sherrill)
 "Nashville" by the Indigo Girls
 "Nashville" by Pupo
 "Nashville #1" by Audrey Auld Mezera
 "Nashville Blues" by The Delmore Brothers
 "Nashville Blues" by Earl Scruggs
 "Nashville Bum" by Waylon Jennings, from Nashville Rebel 1966
 "Nashville Cats" by The Lovin' Spoonful 1966
 "Nashville Grey Skies" by The Shires (country duo) from England
 "Nashville Parthenon" by Casiotone for the Painfully Alone
 "The Nashville Scene" by Hank Williams Jr. from Five-O 1985
 "Nashville Rash" by Dale Watson
 "Nashville Skyline Rag" by Bob Dylan 1969, country rock from Nashville Skyline
 "Nashville West" by The Byrds
 "Nashville Winter" by Nick 13
 "Nashville Without You" by Tim McGraw
 "Never Goin' Back To Nashville" by John Stewart, The Lovin' Spoonful
"No No Song" by Hoyt Axton also sung by Ringo Starr

M
 "Magic Town" by Marty Stuart
 "Murder On Music Row" by Larry Cordle

S
 "Sally G" by Wings
 "South Nashville Blues" by Steve Earle
 "Strings of Nashville" by Pavement
 "Sundown in Nashville" by Marty Stuart

W
 "Welcome to Nashville" by Halfway to Hazard
 "West Coast Kid" by Toby Mac
 "West Nashville Boogie" by Steve Earle
 "West Nashville Grand Ballroom Gown" by Jimmy Buffett
 "Woke up in Nashville" by Seth Ennis

References

Nashville, Tennessee
Nashville
Nashville, Tennessee-related lists
Culture of Nashville, Tennessee